Qeshlaq-e Ojaq-e Yek (also Romanized as Qeshlāq-e Ojāq-e Yek) is a village in Qeshlaq-e Gharbi Rural District, Aslan Duz District, Parsabad County, Ardabil Province, Iran. At the 2006 census, its population was 99, in 25 families.

References 

Towns and villages in Parsabad County